Avi Zev Weider is an American film director, writer, producer, and sound mixer. He is best known for his work on the films Welcome to the Machine and I Remember.

Career
Avi wrote, directed, and produced the short film, I Remember, which premiered at the Sundance Film Festival in 1998. He is the owner of the production company LOOP Filmworks. He wrote and developed the Sloan Foundation and Sundance Institute-supported project Zeros and Ones. He is the recipient of a 2008 New York Foundation for the Arts (NYFA) Fellowship in screenwriting and a 2009 Sloan Fellowship for Zeroes and Ones. In 2012, his feature documentary, Welcome to the Machine premiered at South by Southwest. As a sound supervisor, designer, and mixer, Avi has credits in the broadcast, cable, studio, livestream, and feature film.

Filmography

As sound mixer

 Gossip (2021)
 Doctor's Orders (2021)
 Lady Boss: The Jackie Collins Story (2021)
 Street Gang: How We Got to Sesame Street (2021)
 I Am Greta (2020)
 Surviving Jeffrey Epstein (2020)
 Love & Stuff (2020)
 Forever Alone (2020)
 Grant (2020)
 Jeffrey Epstein: Filthy Rich (2020)
 The Innocence Files (2020)
 D. Wade Life Unexpected (2020)
 Wrong Man (2028-2020)
 Who's Next? (2019)
 Heavy: Fury v Schwarz (2019)

 Dads (2019)
 Paris to Pittsburgh (2018)
 Unspeakable Crime: The Killing of Jessica Chambers (2018)
 The Fourth Estate (2018)
 Gone: The Forgotten Women of Ohio (2017)
 From the Ashes (2017)
 Intent to Destroy (2017)
 Killing Richard Glossip (2017)
 Five Came Back (2017)
 Independent Lens (2017)
 America Divided (2016)
 Parole Board: Victims Speak (2016)
 We Are X (2016)
 Lidia Celebrates America (2015)

Awards and nominations

References

External links 
 
 

Living people
American documentary film directors
American documentary film producers
Year of birth missing (living people)